Ramkrishna Singha Dev was the fifty-ninth king of the Mallabhum. He ruled from 1876 to 1885 CE.

History

Personal life
Ramkrishna Singha Dev was a very benevolent king and was pleasing all his subjects. He had no son and in 1885 he died. His Queen Dwhaja Moni Devi ruled from 1885 to 1888. Then in 1889 Queen Dwhaja Moni Devi enthroned Nilmoni Singha Dev the descendant of Chaitanya Singha Dev second son Nimai Singha.

References

Sources
 

Malla rulers
Kings of Mallabhum
19th-century Indian monarchs
Mallabhum